The Very Best of Eddie Cochran is the fifth album posthumously released in the US after Eddie Cochran's death in 1960.

Content
The album was released on the United Artists Records label in 1975. The catalogue number was LA.428-E.

Track listing
Side 1
 "Summertime Blues"
 "Sittin' in the Balcony"
 "Twenty-Flight Rock"
 "Cut Across Shorty"
 "Nervous Breakdown"

Side 2
 "C'mon Everybody"
 "Hallelujah! I Love Her So"
 "Teenage Heaven"
 "Somethin' Else"
 "Milk Cow Blues"

Notes

External links

Eddie Cochran albums
1975 greatest hits albums
United Artists Records compilation albums